The corneal epithelium (epithelium corneae anterior layer) is made up of epithelial tissue and covers the front of the cornea. It acts as a barrier to protect the cornea, resisting the free flow of fluids from the tears, and prevents bacteria from entering the epithelium and corneal stroma.

Anatomy
The corneal epithelium consists of several layers of cells. The cells of the deepest layer are columnar, known as basal cells which are attached by multiprotein complexes known as hemidesmosomes to an underlying basement membrane. Then follow two or three layers of polyhedral cells, commonly known as wing cells. The majority of these are prickle cells, similar to those found in the stratum mucosum of the cuticle. Lastly, there are three or four layers of squamous cells, with flattened nuclei. The layers of the epithelium are constantly undergoing mitosis. Basal and wing cells migrate to the anterior of the cornea, while squamous cells age and slough off into the tear film.

Central thickness of corneal epithelial layer is approximately 50 to 52 μm.

Cornea cell LASIK complication 
Epithelial ingrowth is a LASIK complication in which cells from the cornea surface layer (epithelial cells) begin to grow underneath the corneal flap. This complication is not present in PRK or other non-flap vision correction procedures.

See also
 Stratified squamous epithelium

Disorders 
Peripheral ulcerative keratitis
Recurrent corneal erosion

External links 
 Epithelium Ingrowth After LASIK

References 

Human eye anatomy